Rashid Ahmad bin Fahad was born in Dubai, the United Arab Emirates, in 1964. He was the Minister of Environment & Water from February 2008 to February 2016.

References

1964 births
Emirati civil engineers
Emirati chemical engineers
Emirati politicians
Living people
People from Dubai
Environment ministers of the United Arab Emirates